BNTU-BelAZ Minsk Region, previously Politechnik or BGPA Minsk, is a handball club from Minsk, Belarus. They currently compete in the Belarusian Championship where they are en-titre and multiple champions.

Titles 
 Belarusian Championship
 Winners (24) : 1993, 1994, 1995, 1996, 1997, 1998, 1999, 2000, 2001, 2002, 2003, 2004, 2005, 2006, 2007, 2009, 2010, 2011, 2012, 2013, 2014, 2015, 2018, 2021
 Runners-up (5): 2008, 2016, 2017, 2019, 2020
 Belarusian Cup
 Winners (16) : 1998, 1999, 2000, 2001, 2002, 2003, 2004, 2005, 2006, 2009, 2010, 2011, 2012, 2013, 2014, 2018
 Finalist (5): 2008, 2015, 2016, 2017, 2019

European record

External links 
 EHF Profile

Belarusian handball clubs
Sport in Minsk
1974 establishments in Belarus
Handball clubs established in 1974